William Eli Baker (February 25, 1873 – June 4, 1954), frequently known as W. E. Baker, was a United States district judge of the United States District Court for the Northern District of West Virginia.

Education and career

Born in Beverly, West Virginia, Baker received a Bachelor of Science degree from West Virginia Wesleyan College in 1893 and an Artium Baccalaureus degree and a Bachelor of Laws from West Virginia University in 1896. He was in private practice in Elkins, West Virginia from 1896 to 1921. He was special counsel to United States Senators Stephen Benton Elkins and Henry Gassaway Davis, both of West Virginia. He was also prosecuting attorney of Randolph County, West Virginia from 1900 to 1912.

Federal judicial service

Baker received a recess appointment from President Warren G. Harding on April 4, 1921, to a seat on the United States District Court for the Northern District of West Virginia vacated by Judge Alston G. Dayton. He was nominated to the same position by President Harding on April 14, 1921. He was confirmed by the United States Senate on May 3, 1921, and received his commission the same day. He served as Chief Judge from 1948 to 1954. He assumed senior status on April 3, 1954. His service terminated on June 4, 1954, due to his death in Beverly.

References

Sources
 

1873 births
1954 deaths
20th-century American lawyers
County prosecuting attorneys in West Virginia
Judges of the United States District Court for the Northern District of West Virginia
People from Elkins, West Virginia
People from Beverly, West Virginia
United States district court judges appointed by Warren G. Harding
20th-century American judges
West Virginia lawyers
West Virginia University College of Law alumni
West Virginia Wesleyan College alumni